Loxopholis percarinatum, Müller's tegu, is a species of lizard in the family Gymnophthalmidae. It is found in Guyana, Suriname, French Guiana, Venezuela, Colombia, Brazil, and Bolivia.

References

Loxopholis
Reptiles described in 1923
Taxa named by Lorenz Müller